Podor (Wolof: Podoor) is the northernmost town in Senegal, lying on Morfil Island between the Sénégal River and Doué River on the border with Mauritania. It was the location of the ancient state Takrur. It is home to a ruined French colonial fort, built in 1854 as a centre for gold trading, and is the birthplace of fashion designer Oumou Sy,  as well as musicians Baaba Maal and Mansour Seck.

The 2002 census determined the population of the town was 9,472 inhabitants. In 2007, according to official estimates, it had grown to 11,869. It is 99% Muslim.

References 

Populated places in Saint-Louis Region
Communes of Senegal